Kalākaua (November 16, 1836 – January 20, 1891) was the last king and penultimate monarch of the Kingdom of Hawaiʻi. The inherited position of the kingdom's monarch became a legislatively elected office with Lunalilo. Upon Lunalilo's death, Kalākaua won election over his political opponent Queen Emma. He reigned from February 12, 1874, until his death in San Francisco, California, on January 20, 1891.

During his 1874–75 state visit to the United States, he made history as the first reigning monarch to visit the United States. His trip to Washington, D.C. established two diplomatic benchmarks. One was the United States Congress holding their first joint meeting in the body's history, less formal than a joint session, specifically for an audience with him. The second was President Ulysses S. Grant hosting him as honoree of the first state dinner at the White House.

Kalākaua's 1881 world tour was his attempt to save the Hawaiian culture and population from extinction by importing a labor force from Asia-Pacific nations. His efforts brought the small island nation to the attention of world leaders, and also gave him the distinction of being the first reigning monarch to circumnavigate the globe.

The following is a list of scholarly and historical resources related to his life, and to his reign as Hawaiʻi's last king.

As author/compiler/composer/editor/publisher

Chants/songs

Biographies of Kalākaua

Biographies of related people

Hawaiian National Bibliography

Government records and treaties

Cabinet Ministers

Privy Council of State 

Minutes of the Privy Council, 1873–1892

General related records 

 
 - 1884 in English, 1886 and 1888 in the Hawaiian language
 - 1884 and 1885, contains statistics, bios and other details of the government

Laws 

37 pages relating to the Bayonet Constitution

Reciprocity treaty

Historiography

Journals

Thrum's Almanac

Primary sources

Political satire

See also 
Bibliography of Liliʻuokalani
MOS Hawaii-related articles

Maps

References

External link 
 

Bibliographies of people
History of Hawaii
House of Kalākaua
Political bibliographies